Typhlatya rogersi is a species of basket shrimp in the family Atyidae. It is found in South America and Africa.

References

Further reading

 

Atyidae
Articles created by Qbugbot
Crustaceans described in 1972